First Avenue or 1st Avenue can refer to:

 1st Avenue (Chicago), a thoroughfare in Chicago
 First Avenue (Manhattan), a major thoroughfare in New York City
 First Avenue (nightclub), a music venue in downtown Minneapolis, Minnesota
 First Avenue (Seattle), a street in downtown Seattle

See also
 First Avenue Records, a former record label acquired by Arista Records
 First Avenue South Bridge, a bridge in Seattle
 First Avenue station (PAAC), a station on the Port Authority of Allegheny County's light rail network
 First Avenue Public School, an elementary school in Ottawa, Ontario, Canada
 First Avenue (BMT Canarsie Line), a subway station
 List of highways numbered 1
 First Street (disambiguation)